The 8th Division is a division of the Iraqi Army. Before being reformed after 2004 it was part of the previous Iraqi Army. Just before the Iran–Iraq War it was located at Erbil as part of the 1st Corps. The 8th Division is composed of former Iraqi National Guard units, some of which were formed as early as 2004, but the division headquarters did not assume control of its area of operations until January 2006.

On 7 September 2006, Prime Minister Nouri al-Maliki signed a document taking control of Iraq's small naval and air forces and the 8th Iraqi Army Division, based in the south. The 8th Division's commander, Brig. Gen. Othman al-Farhoud, told the Associated Press his forces still needed support from the U.S.-led Coalition for things such as medical assistance, storage facilities and air support, stating: "In my opinion, it will take time before his division was completely self-sufficient."As of March 2007, the division commander was still Othman Ali Farhood, but he had been promoted to Major General. The division took part in Operation Lion's Leap in November 2007.

In 2010 the division comprises: (DJ Elliot, Montrose Toast, Information Cut Off, 28 February 2010)
Division Headquarters, Diwaniyah
30th Commando (Motorised) Brigade, HQ Wasit
31st Commando (Motorised) Brigade, HQ Diwaniyah
32nd Commando (Motorised) Brigade, HQ Kut
33rd Commando (Motorised) Brigade, HQ Hussainiyah (Karbala)
8th Field Engineer Regiment, Diwaniyah
8th Transport and Provisioning Regiment, Numaniyah/Diwaniyah

Notes

Bibliography

.

External links
 https://web.archive.org/web/20100401100920/http://www.understandingwar.org/files/reports/Backgrounder06.pdf

Divisions of Iraq
Military units and formations established in 2004